Panchla is a census town in Panchla CD Block of Howrah Sadar subdivision in Howrah district in the Indian state of West Bengal.

Geography
It has an average elevation of 7 metres (22 feet).

Demographics
As per 2011 Census of India Panchla had a total population of 26,432 of which 13,573 (51%) were males and 12,859 (49%) were females. Population below 6 years was 3,528. The total number of literates in Panchla was 18,730 (81.78% of the population over 6 years).

 India census, Panchla had a population of 22,087. Males constitute 52% of the population and females 48%. Panchla has an average literacy rate of 63%, higher than the national average of 59.5%: male literacy is 69%, and female literacy is 58%. In Panchla, 15% of the population is under 6 years of age.

Economics
Zardozi embroidery with gold zari, seed pearls, sequins and beads is mainly produced by Muslim craftsmen of Panchla with six basic designs – leaf, flower, bird, animal, geometric and filler. This ornamental and dramatic embellishment is being used to create exclusive garments and accessories by leading fashion houses worldwide.

References

Cities and towns in Howrah district